Man to Man is the third studio album by British soul band Hot Chocolate. It was released in August 1976 on the RAK Records label, owned by Mickie Most, who was the band's producer. The album peaked at number thirty-two on the UK Albums Chart and one-hundred and seventy-two on the US Billboard 200 album chart.

The original 1976 LP release comprised nine original songs, of which only one, the re-recorded "You Could Have Been a Lady", was credited to the band's original writing team, lead vocalist Errol Brown and bassist Tony Wilson. Wilson had left the group following the band's second studio album. Brown wrote the majority of the album separately, with the band members Harvey Hinsley, Patrick Olive and Tony Connor contributing two songs. The album did not spawn any major hits in the UK or US, although "Don't Stop It Now" and the title track made the UK top twenty.

The album's re-recording of Hot Chocolate's 1971 hit single, "You Could Have Been a Lady", boasts a fuller, heavier production than the original. Rather than the original single version, a 3:48 edit of the re-recording has appeared on all compilation albums issued both by the band and with various other artists.

The album was issued on CD for the first time with two bonus tracks in 2009.

Track listing
All tracks written and composed by Errol Brown; except where indicated.

Side one
 "Heaven Is in the Back Seat of My Cadillac" – 5:10
 "Living on a Shoe String" – 4:19
 "Sugar Daddy" – 5:29
 "Man to Man" – 4:22

Side two
 "You Could've Been a Lady" (Brown, Tony Wilson) – 3:48; 4:25 on some releases
 "Sex Appeal" (Harvey Hinsley, Patrick Olive, Tony Connor) – 4:01
 "Harry" (Hinsley, Olive, Connor) – 4:00
 "Don't Stop It Now" – 3:02
 "Seventeen Years of Age" – 3:56

CD bonus tracks (2009)
 "Beautiful Lady" (Hinsley, Olive, Connor) – 2:48
 "Eyes of a Growing Child" (Hinsley, Olive, Connor) – 3:57

Personnel
Hot Chocolate
Errol Brown – lead vocals
Harvey Hinsley – guitars
Larry Ferguson – keyboards
Patrick Olive – bass guitar, backing vocals
Tony Connor – drums

Production
Mickie Most – producer
Doug Hopkins – engineer
John Cameron – arrangements
Gered Mankowitz – photography

Charts

Certifications

References

Hot Chocolate (band) albums
1976 albums
Rak Records albums
Albums produced by Mickie Most
Albums arranged by John Cameron (musician)
Albums recorded at Morgan Sound Studios
Big Tree Records albums